Prados may refer to:

People
 Emilio Prados (1899–1962), Spanish poet and editor
 John Prados (1951-2022), American writer
 Rafael Clavero Prados (born 1977), Spanish footballer

Places
 Los Prados, a sector of Santo Domingo, Dominican Republic
 Prados (Celorico da Beira), a parish in Celorico da Beira Municipality, Portugal
 Prados, Minas Gerais, Brazil

See also
 Prado (disambiguation)